Émilie Fournel (born October 26, 1986) is a Canadian sprint kayaker who has competed since the late 2000s. She won a bronze medal in the K-1 4 x 200 m event at the 2009 ICF Canoe Sprint World Championships in Dartmouth, and in the K-1 5000 m at the 2015 ICF Canoe Sprint World Championships.

Fournel competed in the K-4 500 m event at the 2008 Summer Olympics in Beijing, but was eliminated in the semifinals, and the K-1 200 m and 500 m at the 2012 Summer Olympics.

Her father, Jean Fournel, competed for Canada in sprint canoe at the 1976 Summer Olympics in Montreal. Her brother Hugues Fournel also competed at the 2012 Summer Olympics in the Men's K-2 200 metres with Ryan Cochrane.

In July 2016, she was officially named to Canada's Olympic team.

References

External links
 
 
 
 
 

1986 births
Canadian female canoeists
Canoeists at the 2008 Summer Olympics
Canoeists at the 2012 Summer Olympics
Canoeists at the 2016 Summer Olympics
Canoeists at the 2011 Pan American Games
Living people
Olympic canoeists of Canada
People from Dorval
Canoeists from Montreal
ICF Canoe Sprint World Championships medalists in kayak
Pan American Games gold medalists for Canada
Pan American Games silver medalists for Canada
Pan American Games medalists in canoeing
Canoeists at the 2015 Pan American Games
Medalists at the 2015 Pan American Games
Medalists at the 2011 Pan American Games